Valley Hill is an unincorporated community and census-designated place (CDP) in Henderson County, North Carolina, United States. The population was 2,070 at the 2010 census. It is part of the Asheville Metropolitan Statistical Area.

Geography
Valley Hill is located in central Henderson County at  (35.297615, -82.484221). It is bordered to the north by the town of Laurel Park and to the northeast by the city of Hendersonville, the county seat.

Osceola Lake, a reservoir built on Shepherd Creek, is the largest water body in the community.

Demographics

As of the census of 2000, there were 2,137 people, 891 households, and 598 families residing in the CDP. The population density was 904.4 people per square mile (349.6/km). There were 1,049 housing units at an average density of 443.9 per square mile (171.6/km). The racial makeup of the CDP was 94.81% White, 2.34% African American, 0.09% Native American, 1.22% Asian, 0.05% Pacific Islander, 0.56% from other races, and 0.94% from two or more races. Hispanic or Latino of any race were 5.62% of the population.

There were 891 households, out of which 25.7% had children under the age of 18 living with them, 57.0% were married couples living together, 7.3% had a female householder with no husband present, and 32.8% were non-families. 29.5% of all households were made up of individuals, and 12.6% had someone living alone who was 65 years of age or older. The average household size was 2.23 and the average family size was 2.73.

In the CDP, the population was spread out, with 18.2% under the age of 18, 5.2% from 18 to 24, 25.3% from 25 to 44, 25.6% from 45 to 64, and 25.5% who were 65 years of age or older. The median age was 46 years. For every 100 females, there were 93.2 males. For every 100 females age 18 and over, there were 88.7 males.

The median income for a household in the CDP was $32,250, and the median income for a family was $37,325. Males had a median income of $31,795 versus $21,932 for females. The per capita income for the CDP was $19,922. About 11.1% of families and 12.4% of the population were below the poverty line, including 21.2% of those under age 18 and 7.0% of those age 65 or over.

References

Census-designated places in Henderson County, North Carolina
Census-designated places in North Carolina
Asheville metropolitan area